Daan Reiziger (born 18 June 2001) is a Dutch professional footballer who plays as a goalkeeper for Eredivisie club Vitesse.

Club career

Ajax
Born in Glimmen, a suburb of Groningen, Reiziger began his youth career at local club Be Quick 1887, before moving to the youth academy of FC Groningen in 2012. In 2016, Reiziger moved to Ajax. He signed a three-year contract extension with the club in December 2017. He was part of the under-17 team in the 2016–17 and 2017–18 seasons, before being promoted to the under-19 team. On 26 January 2019, Reiziger scored the 1–1 equaliser in a U19 Cup match against NAC. 

On 3 March 2020, Reiziger was brought on by head coach Johnny Heitinga as a 90th-minute substitute for the penalty shootout in a UEFA Youth League round of 16 match against Atlético Madrid. He saved three of the penalties he faced as Ajax won 6–5, with Reiziger scoring on the deciding penalty kick.

Reiziger played his first professional game for Jong Ajax on 19 March 2021, as a starter in a 4–3 win over MVV.

He made an appearance on the bench for the senior team, but was an unused substitute in a 3-1 win over VVV-Venlo on 13 May 2021.

Vitesse 
On 20 May 2021, it was announced that Reiziger would sign with Eredivisie club Vitesse on a three-year contract.

He made his debut on 4 September 2022, replacing the injured Kjell Scherpen in Vitesse's starting lineup against FC Groningen, and keeping a clean sheet in a 1–0 away win.

International career
Reiziger has represented Netherlands at youth international levels from under-16 to under-19.

Career statistics

(-) Not qualified

References

2001 births
Living people
Dutch footballers
Netherlands youth international footballers
Be Quick 1887 players
FC Groningen players
AFC Ajax players
Jong Ajax players
SBV Vitesse players
Eerste Divisie players
Eredivisie players
Association football goalkeepers
Footballers from Groningen (city)